Janice Lynde is an American actress.

The Houston-born, Lake Charles, Louisiana-reared Lynde began her career with the Dallas Symphony, both as a pianist and as a vocal soloist. The child of German parents Marvin and Sophia Zoch, she had to learn English in kindergarten.

She attended Indiana University and the University of Pennsylvania, studying music at both institutions.

Lynde's performances at Indiana University brought her to the attention of musician Fred Waring, which led to her being a soloist with Waring and his Pennsylvanians choir for two years.

After she graduated from college, she began a career in acting in New York City, where her Broadway credits include Applause, The Me Nobody Knows, and Butterflies Are Free.

In 1973, she moved to Los Angeles, where she was among the original cast members of the CBS soap opera The Young and the Restless, playing "Leslie Brooks". She left the series in early 1977. Two years later, Lynde joined Another World as "Tracy DeWitt"; she left the role in 1981. In 1984, she starred as Laurel Chapin Wolek in One Life to Live, which she left in 1986.

She appeared in several film and television programs, including a notable role in the episode "A Hand for Sonny Blue" of Quinn Martin's Tales of the Unexpected (1977) as well as Match Game. Lynde also appeared on an episode of the game show Tattletales along with her Young and the Restless co-star William Gray Espy.

Filmography

Film

Television

References

External links

Living people
American soap opera actresses
American television actresses
Actresses from Louisiana
People from Lake Charles, Louisiana
21st-century American women
Year of birth missing (living people)